The Stone City is the site of an ancient fortified city within Nanjing, Jiangsu province, China. Almost all of the original city is gone; all that remains are portions of the massive city wall.

History
The original town was built during the Warring States period (475-221 BC) by people from the Chu kingdom.

Sun Quan (182-252), ruler of the Wu Kingdom, had what is now called Stone City built on a hill overlooking the Yangtze. It was used for naval training by General Zhou Yu (175-210). On a political visit to the area, the prime minister of the Shu Kingdom, Zhuge Liang (181-234) described the Qingliangshan Hill and Stone City area as "Zhongshan curling like a dragon and the Stone City crouching like a tiger".

The stone wall is all the remains from the ancient city. The ancient city is strongly enough associated with Nanjing that Nanjing itself is sometimes referred to as "Stone City".

Park

One of the most famous of its landmarks is the "Ghost-Faced Wall". The ancient city wall from Caochang Gate to Qingliang Gate has been strengthened to prevent it from collapsing.

Transportation
The area is accessible within walking distance north west of Hanzhongmen Station of Nanjing Metro.

See also 
 Defence Park (Nanjing), within Stone City
 Qingliangshan Park, adjacent to Stone City

References 

Fortifications in China
Buildings and structures in Nanjing
Tourist attractions in Nanjing
Chu (state)
Eastern Wu